Dysaster is a genus of flowering plants belonging to the family Asteraceae.

Its native range is Peru.

Species:
 Dysaster cajamarcensis H.Rob. & V.A.Funk

References

Asteraceae
Asteraceae genera